Verwolde is a former municipality in the Dutch province of Gelderland. It existed between 1818 and 1854, when it was merged with Laren. The area is now a part of Lochem.

References

Former municipalities of Gelderland
Lochem